James L. Frazier Jr. (born May 4, 1959) is an American politician who served in the California State Assembly. He is a Democrat who previously represented the 11th Assembly District, which encompasses Solano County, eastern Contra Costa County, and a portion of rural Sacramento County.

Prior to being elected to the Assembly in 2012, he was an Oakley City Councilmember and Mayor.

Legislative career 

During his first term, Frazier's legislation focused on roadway safety and infrastructure.  He authored Assembly Bill 1113, concerning provisional driver's licenses, which sought to strengthen teen driver-licensing programs and improve the safety of the roadways.  He also authored Assembly Bill 417, which lessened the processes needed to authorize bike lanes in urbanized areas.  He authored Assembly Bill 513, which expands the use of rubberized asphalt (made from waste tires) in roads and other transportation projects. And he authored Assembly Bill 1336, which provides the state with added enforcement powers necessary to ensure that workers are paid mandated wages.

During the 2014-15 legislative session, Frazier served as Chair of the Assembly Transportation Committee. In this role, he contributed to the defeat of a bill seeking to explicitly add representation from disadvantage communities to the California Transportation Commission, stating that "the bill would elevate disadvantaged communities and their interests above all others, and we can’t have that."

Frazier resigned from the State Assembly on December 31, 2021, to pursue opportunities in the transportation sector.

2014 California State Assembly

2016 California State Assembly

2018 California State Assembly

2020 California State Assembly

References

External links 
 
 Campaign website

Democratic Party members of the California State Assembly
1959 births
Living people
Place of birth missing (living people)
Mayors of places in California
California city council members
People from Martinez, California
People from Oakley, California
21st-century American politicians